Bernardino Vitulini was an Italian painter. He was born in Serravalle, and lived at Belluno. He is known to have painted frescoes in the church of Ampezzo and Cadore, in 1350.

References

People from Belluno
14th-century Italian painters
Italian male painters
Year of death unknown
Year of birth unknown